Diego Lainez Leyva (born 9 June 2000) is a Mexican  professional footballer who plays as a winger for Liga MX club Tigres UANL, on loan from Real Betis, and the Mexico national team.

Club career

América
Lainez was recruited by scout Ángel González along with his brother Mauro. Mauro decided to join Pachuca's academy, while Diego opted to join Club América.

On 1 March 2017, Lainez made his competitive debut with América in the Copa MX group stage match against Santos Laguna. Three days later, he made his league debut against León, becoming one of the club's youngest players to debut for the first team at 16 years old. On 19 March, after a lineup error that ruled out Gerson Torres from being eligible to play, Lainez was assigned to start against Pumas UNAM.

On 4 August 2018, Lainez scored his first two goals for América in a 3–1 win over Pachuca at Estadio Hidalgo; he became the youngest player to score a double with the club, and the fifth youngest to score a goal in the club's history. On 18 September, Lainez suffered a sprained ankle on his left foot during training following a tackle from Bruno Valdez, forcing him to miss out on four weeks of action, including the Súper Clásico against arch-rivals Guadalajara. He would return from injury on 20 October, and scored his first goal playing in the Estadio Azteca as América defeated Tijuana 3–0. Lainez scored in both legs of the Apertura semifinal series against Universidad Nacional, making him the youngest player to ever score during the playoff stage for the club.

Betis
On 10 January 2019, Lainez joined La Liga club Real Betis on a five-year contract reportedly worth $14 million. The move made him the youngest player to emigrate from the Liga MX, as well as the second most expensive transfer paid for a Mexican player by a European club. He was handed the squad number 22. He made his debut in La Liga on 20 January in a 3–2 home victory over Girona, making his appearance as an 81st-minute substitute. The following week, Lainez earned a starting berth and played 75 minutes in Real's 1–0 defeat to Athletic de Bilbao. On 14 February, he became the youngest Mexican player to score in the UEFA Europa League when he netted an injury-time equalizer in a 3–3 draw with Rennes in the first leg of the round of 32.

On 19 December, Lainez scored his second competitive goal for Betis – a free kick – in the 4–0 victory over Antoniano in the first round of the Copa del Rey.

Braga (loan)
On 29 July 2022, Lainez joined Primeira Liga club Braga on a season-long loan. On 12 August 2022, Lainez made his debut during a 3–0 win over Famalicão, entering as a substitute at the 73rd minute. On 28 August 2022, Lainez scored his first and only goal with Braga in a 6–0 win over Arouca.

After failing to make an impact at the club, his loan deal was terminated early.

UANL (loan)
On 30 January 2023, Lainez returned to Mexico and joined Tigres UANL on a one-year loan.

International career

Youth
Lainez was ruled out of the 2017 CONCACAF U-17 Championship due to his activity with Club América's first team.

On 14 September 2017, Lainez was included in final roster that participated at the 2017 FIFA U-17 World Cup. In Mexico's second group match against England, Lainez scored twice in the team's 3–2 loss.

On 25 October 2018, Lainez was called up by Diego Ramírez to participate in the 2018 CONCACAF U-20 Championship. Mexico finish runner-up in the competition, with Lainez being named in the Best XI. In April 2019, Lainez was included in the 21-player squad to represent Mexico at the U-20 World Cup in Poland.

Lainez was included in the final roster that participated at the 2018 Toulon Tournament. He scored the opening goal against Qatar in Mexico's 4–1 win. He would go on to win the Best Player Award, as well as make the Best XI of the competition as Mexico finished runner-up.

Lainez was included in the final roster that participated in the 2018 Central American and Caribbean Games. He appeared in all three group stage matches as Mexico finished last in their group with one point.

Ruled out for the 2020 CONCACAF Men's Olympic Qualifying Championship as it was not a FIFA-sanctioned tournament, Lainez was subsequently called up to participate in the 2020 Summer Olympics. He won the bronze medal with the Olympic team.

Senior
On 29 August 2018, Lainez received his first call-up to the senior national team by interim manager Ricardo Ferretti for the friendly matches against Uruguay and the United States. He earned his first cap in Mexico's 4–1 defeat to Uruguay on 7 September. On 13 October 2020, Lainez scored a late-tying goal against Algeria, tying the match at two, his first goal with the national team.

On 6 June 2021, Lainez scored against the United States just seconds after coming on as a substitute in the Concacaf Nations League Final to make it 2–1, but Mexico ultimately lost 3–2. He was included in the Best XI of the tournament.

In October 2022, Lainez was named in Mexico's preliminary 31-man squad by manager Gerardo Martino for the World Cup, but did not make the final 26.

Career statistics

Club

International

Scores and results list Mexico's goal tally first, score column indicates score after each Lainez goal.

Style of play

Described as "a diminutive, left-footed forward with a sharp burst of pace", Lainez has been praised as one of the best young players in the world, being featured in The Guardian 2017 list of the 60 best young talents in world football, as well as Goal.com's 2017, 2018, and 2019 NxGn lists of the world's best teenage players.

Lainez has shown maturity in his playing style despite his young age. He has been described as "creative and methodical in terms of orchestrating attacks. Despite being a teenager, Lainez has a very mature reading of the game which often fuels his sharp decision-making on the field." Lainez appears equally adept at passing and crossing as well as not shirking away from his defensive duties. Thomas Harrison of Outsideoftheboot.com described him as "a winger who can also operate as a 'number ten', [he] is renowned for his outstanding balance, trickery and change of pace when running with the ball, and the stats back up this belief. Diego ended the 2017–18 with a dribble success rate of above 65%, one of the highest figures for an attacking player in Liga MX." He is also known for his high-rated dribbling attributes in the popular video game franchise FIFA as a silver player. He has cited Lionel Messi as an idol and an influence on his playing style.

Honours
América
Liga MX: Apertura 2018

Betis
Copa del Rey: 2021–22

Mexico U23
Olympic Bronze Medal: 2020

Individual
Toulon Tournament Golden Ball: 2018
Toulon Tournament Best XI: 2018
CONCACAF Under-20 Championship Best XI: 2018
CONCACAF Nations League Finals Best XI: 2021

References

External links
 
 

2000 births
Living people
People from Villahermosa
Footballers from Tabasco
Mexico international footballers
Mexico under-20 international footballers
Mexico youth international footballers
Association football wingers
Club América footballers
Real Betis players
Liga MX players
La Liga players
Mexican expatriate footballers
Expatriate footballers in Spain
Footballers at the 2020 Summer Olympics
Olympic footballers of Mexico
Olympic medalists in football
Olympic bronze medalists for Mexico
Medalists at the 2020 Summer Olympics
Mexican expatriate sportspeople in Portugal
Mexican footballers